Rovensko pod Troskami is a town in Semily District in the Liberec Region of the Czech Republic. It has about 1,300 inhabitants.

Administrative parts
Villages of Blatec, Křečovice 2.díl, Liščí Kotce, Štěpánovice and Václaví are administrative parts of Rovensko pod Troskami.

Notable people
Václav Karel Holan Rovenský (1644–1718), composer and organist
Dana Brožková (born 1981), orienteering competitor

References

External links

 

Cities and towns in the Czech Republic
Populated places in Semily District